Huguo Temple is a Buddhist temple located on the top of Mount Danxia, in the town of Danxia, Panzhou, Guizhou, China.

History
It is said that the temple was originally built in 1451, in the 2nd year of Jingtai period of the Ming dynasty (1368–1644). And another saying that the temple was first built in the ruling of Wanli Emperor of the Ming dynasty, between 1573 and 1620. The oldest temple was a Taoist temple known as "Xuandi Palace" and was completely destroyed by war in 1620. Four years later, monk Shi Bumei, a former general, came to the Mount Danxia to build two temples, namely Yuanzhen Palace and Danxia Temple. One was a Taoist temple, the other was a Buddhist temple. In 1638, travel writer and geographer Xu Xiake explored the region. In his travelogue book Xu Xiake's Travels, Mount Danxia was described as pillar of heaven.

In 1781, during the reign of Qianlong Emperor of the Qing dynasty (1644–1911), Chan master Shi Changyi settled at the temple and promulgated Buddhist doctrines. In 1904, Shi Guangyi resided in the temple and disseminated Buddhism. Two years later, Shi Shengrong went to Beijing to celebrate Empress Dowager Cixi's birthday, and was granted the sutra, kasaya, jade seal and golden bowl. He renamed the temple "Huguo Temple" (Protect the Country Temple) after returning. 

In 1926, Shi Liaofan began to build a tower named "Sun Watching" on the pool of the central hall, which was five stories high and hung with a plaque of Chinese characters "Beautiful Scenery in Southern Sky". It was completed in the following year.

In 1964, many text documents were burned to ashes in the fire after the temple caught fire.

Architecture
Huguo Temple is built along the up and down of Mount Danxia, now the existing main buildings include Shanmen, Hall of Maitreya, Mahavira Hall, Great Compassion Pavilion, Jade Buddha Hall, Guanyin Hall, Sun Watching Tower, and dining room. Plaques of Chinese characters "Mount Danxia", "Huguo Temple" and "Mahavira Hall" was written by former Venerable Master of the Buddhist Association of China Zhao Puchu.

National treasure
 Two volumes of palm-leaf manuscript

Gallery

References

Buddhist temples in Guizhou
Buildings and structures in Panzhou
Tourist attractions in Panzhou
15th-century establishments in China
15th-century Buddhist temples